The 3 arrondissements of the Eure department are:
 Arrondissement of Les Andelys, (subprefecture: Les Andelys) with 185 communes. The population of the arrondissement was 235,732 in 2016.  
 Arrondissement of Bernay, (subprefecture: Bernay) with 297 communes. The population of the arrondissement was 227,054 in 2016.  
 Arrondissement of Évreux, (prefecture of the Eure department: Évreux) with 103 communes. The population of the arrondissement was 140,039 in 2016.

History

In 1800 the arrondissements of Évreux, Les Andelys, Bernay, Louviers and Pont-Audemer were established. The arrondissements of Louviers and Pont-Audemer were disbanded in 1926. On 1 January 2006, the arrondissement of Évreux lost the two cantons of Louviers-Nord and Louviers-Sud to the arrondissement of Les Andelys, and the canton of Amfreville-la-Campagne to the arrondissement of Bernay.

The borders of the arrondissements of Eure were modified in January 2017:
 one commune from the arrondissement of Les Andelys to the arrondissement of Bernay
 one commune from the arrondissement of Bernay to the arrondissement of Évreux
 35 communes from the arrondissement of Évreux to the arrondissement of Les Andelys
 77 communes from the arrondissement of Évreux to the arrondissement of Bernay

References

Eure